Pentafluorosulfanylbenzene, or phenylsulfur pentafluoride, is an organosulfur compound with the formula C6H5SF5. It is colorless liquid with high chemical stability.

Reactivity 
Pentafluorosulfanylbenzene possesses high chemical stability under a wide range of conditions including oxidizing, reducing, strongly acidic and strongly basic environments. For example, it does not react with a refluxing solution of sodium hydroxide in aqueous ethanol, but it can react with concentrated sulfuric acid at elevated temperatures.
The pentafluorosulfanyl group is a strong electron withdrawing group, and leads to electrophilic aromatic substitution reactions at the meta position.

Synthesis 
Pentafluorosulfanylbenzene was originally synthesized by fluorination of diphenyl disulfide by AgF2, a method that suffers from low yield. The best known method of synthesis is the fluorination of diphenyl disulfide with xenon difluoride, but it still only has a 25% yield.

C12H10S2 + 5 XeF2 -> 2C6H5SF5 + 5Xe

References 

Phenyl compounds
Organosulfur compounds
Sulfur fluorides